Franz Schubert wrote about a hundred waltzes for piano solo. Particularly well known among these are two named collections, the 34 Valses Sentimentales (Op. 50, D. 779) and the 12 Valses Nobles (Op. 77, D. 969).

Composition history and background
Schubert's piano music was slow in taking its place in the standard repertoire of piano literature. Until the early 20th century his vast piano solo production was often criticized for being salon music.

The Valses Sentimentales were written in 1823, and the Valses Nobles are believed to have been written in 1827, the year before Schubert's death, although the manuscript is undated.

External links
  
 
 

Piano music by Franz Schubert
Compositions for solo piano
Waltzes
1823 compositions
1827 compositions